FGH may refer to:
 Fishguard Harbour railway station, in Wales
 The Fort Garry Horse, a Canadian Army Reserve armoured regiment
 Furness General Hospital, in Barrow-in-Furness, England 
Fast-growing hierarchy, a method to describe fast-growing functions.